Ahmet Kulabas (born October 8, 1987) is a Turkish-German footballer who is currently playing for Boluspor.

External links

1987 births
Living people
German footballers
German people of Turkish descent
1. FC Nürnberg II players
1. FC Heidenheim players
SV Eintracht Trier 05 players
SV Wacker Burghausen players
3. Liga players
Association football forwards
People from Esslingen am Neckar
Sportspeople from Stuttgart (region)
Footballers from Baden-Württemberg